AWM may refer to:
Academies of West Memphis, a public high school in West Memphis, Arkansas
Appliance Wiring Material, covered by UL standard 758
Apostolic Women's Ministries, an organization that serves the women of the Apostolic Church of Pentecost
Arctic Warfare Magnum or Accuracy International AWM, a British-made sniper rifle
Ardent Window Manager, an early window manager for the X Window System
Ashwell & Morden railway station, United Kingdom National Rail code AWM
Association for Women in Mathematics, a professional society to support women in mathematics
Atlantis World Media, parent company of the Atlantis Cable News (ACN) fictional news channel on the American TV series The Newsroom
Australian War Memorial, a memorial to Australian soldiers in Canberra